Bella Vista Ambulance Services was a non-profit corporation that provided Emergency Medical Services in Bella Vista, Arkansas from 1977 to 2010. It had a  office located at 652 Lancashire Blvd., Bella Vista.  In 2004, the Bella Vista Fire Department received 1,403 medical calls. As of 2010 the Bella Vista Ambulance Services were turned completely over to the control of the Bella Vista Fire Department.

See also
Bella Vista Fire Department

References
Bella Vista Ambulance Services Finds New Office – The Morning News
Ambulance Service Accepting New Members – Bella Vista Property Owners Association
Map: 

Ambulance services in the United States
Medical and health organizations based in Arkansas
Ambulance Services